The 316th Sustainment Command (Expeditionary) (ESC), is one of six general officer sustainment commands in the Army Reserve. It has command and control of more than 10,000 Army Reserve Soldiers throughout the northeastern United States.

The ESC is a peacetime subordinate to the 377th Theater Sustainment Command.

History
The original 316th Logistical Command was constituted on 17 November 1950 in the Organized Reserve Corps and activated on 1 December 1950 at Knoxville, Tenn. The 316th Logistical Command was redesignated on 9 July 1952 in the Army Reserve and again on 30 November 1960 as Headquarters Detachment, 316th Logistical Command. The unit was deactivated in 1968 at Knoxville.
 
On 17 January 2006, the command was redesignated as Headquarters and Headquarters Company, 316th Sustainment Command (Expeditionary) and was activated on 16 September 2007 at Coraopolis, Pa.
The 316th Sustainment Command is the U.S. Army's first transformation-era modular ESC unit, and the first to deploy to Iraq. The 316th transformed from a traditionally structured force to one designed to better address sustained military operations and missions and the nation's emergency rapid response.
 
The 316th is a model for future military operations around the world with a deployment mission to provide command and control of all sustainment forces in an operational theater.
While in Iraq (August 2007-June 2008), the 316th ESC, composed of more than 20,000 sustainment Soldiers, synchronized and provided logistical support to U.S. units (165,000), Multi-National Coalition partners and Iraqi Forces in support of all operations. That support translated into everything from bullets to beans, fuel to maintenance parts and coordinating certain human resource services (liaison teams, personnel replacements, finance).

Subordinate units 

As of 2017 the following units are subordinated to the 316th Sustainment Command (Expeditionary):
 316th Sustainment Command (Expeditionary), in Coraopolis, Pennsylvania
 77th Sustainment Brigade, in Fort Totten, New York
 301st Regional Support Group, in Butler, Pennsylvania
 475th Quartermaster Group, in Farrell, Pennsylvania
 655th Regional Support Group, in Westover Air Reserve Base, Massachusetts

Shoulder Sleeve Insignia (SSI) 
The 316th's unit patch is a white disc within a 1/8-inch red border, 2 inches in diameter. The colors red, white and blue represent the support rendered by the command of combat service support organizations. The blue compass represents the four cardinal points and red represents the secondary points of the compass indicating worldwide deployability and readiness of the 316th ESC. The center of the patch bears a white fleur-de lis, representing the lily, the state flower of Tennessee, and the City of Knoxville, the original home of the 316th Logistical Command.

External links
 316th Sustainment Command (Expeditionary) Home Page

References

Military units and formations of the United States Army Reserve
316